Tesla, Inc. operates plants worldwide for the manufacture of their products, including electric vehicles, lithium-ion batteries, solar shingles, chargers, automobile parts, and manufacturing equipment and tools for its own factories. The following is a list of current and former facilities.

Current production facilities

Former production facilities

Note: Maxwell Technologies was acquired by Tesla in 2019 for their battery technology. Maxwell continued to operate as subsidiary until 2021. Due to the short holding time and no known products produced under Tesla, their production facilities are not listed above.

Notes

References

External links
 Manufacturing official website,
 "Here's Where Tesla Produces Its Electric Cars Around the World", Newsweek, 2021-08-03

Tesla
Tesla, Inc.
 
Tesla
Battery (electricity)